The development of feudal society in the region of Rus' took a different course to that in Western Europe. In particular, under the version of manorialism practised in Rus', knights granted land by a prince were not bound in allegiance to that prince; and instead of serfdom much of the land was worked by a partially free peasant class (smerd). In consequence, there was no strong central monarchy able to resist invasions by the Lithuanians, Tatars and Mongols. A strong central power emerged only later, particularly under Ivan III of Russia, which defeated the invaders, unified the territory of Rus', and laid claim to large areas of land.

Origins of Russian/Muscovite manorialism 
At the end of the first millennium AD, Europe was experiencing the full effects of the order and advances in social structure begun during the early Middle Ages; however, the structure and development(s) characterising medieval European society were not found beyond the Carpathian Mountains, and the region of Rus' remained as a disordered regionalist "state". The early development of feudal society in the absence of a strong central government helped the European states overcome the harshness experienced in the Dark Ages by enabling the creation of strong governments.

In Western Europe, a manorial (economic)/feudal (political) system was created, culminating in the full development of feudal society spreading across Europe and to England; a society which divided land, top to bottom, from the monarch to his immediate trustee or vassal, to the peasant or serf, who worked the fiefs in tribute, in return for protection from invaders. This symbiotic system created the first central governments throughout Christendom since the fall of Rome.

The history of Eastern Europe, Rus' in particular, was different. Due to the expansion of trade and its geographical proximity, Kiev became the most important trade center of Kievan Rus' and chief among the communes; therefore the leader of Kiev gained political "control" over the surrounding areas. This princedom emerged from a coalition of nuclear families banded together in an effort to increase the available workforce and expand the productivity of the land. This union developed the first major cities in Rus' and was the first notable form of self-government. As these communes became larger, the emphasis was taken off the family holdings and placed on the territory that surrounded them. This shift in ideology became known as the verv'.

The change in political structure led to the inevitable development of the peasant class or smerds. Smerds were free peasants who found work by laboring for wages on the manors which began to develop around 1031 as the verv' began to dominate socio-political structure. Smerds were initially given equality in the Kievan law code, being theoretically equal to the prince, so they enjoyed as much freedom as can be expected of manual laborers. However, in the 13th century they began to slowly lose their rights and became less equal in the eyes of the law.

Contrasts between European feudalism and Kievan manorialism 
The major difference between the Kievan manorial system and European feudalism consists in the fact that lands granted by a prince to a knight held no obligation; that is to say if the knight wished to leave the service of the prince, who usually expected loyalty, he was able to do so with no obligation whatsoever and was also able to retain possession of the granted land. Therefore, the political structure created by Western European feudalism was not transferred to the Rus' by its manorial system. Rather, the manorial system was more of an economic control.

The manor owners in Rus' usually relied on direct production from their land and chose not to rent it out, which proved a stark contrast to feudal Europe in which by the High Middle Ages most of its land was claimed by monarchs, who in turn parceled it to vassals who rented the land to serfs. Even though it became increasingly common for one knight to have landholdings in several different princedoms, due to the use of direct production, the land of the Rus' was still largely in the hands of the peasants during the 12th century.

By 1100 it started to become more apparent that the smerds were considered lower than their totally independent counterparts in Europe (free traders); however, it is important to note the smerds still had much more freedom than the growing peon/serf class of Europe. Even though this indentured class grew greatly in numbers, the economy of Kievan Russia blossomed until 1125, the year of the death of Prince Vladimir Monomakh.

Through its history, the Kievan coalition inherited a tradition of lateral succession to the princedom; that is to say, that when a prince died, he was replaced by his brother, then he by the next brother, etc. with this repeating until the last brother was reached and then succession transferred back to the elder prince's son. Unfortunately for the Kievians, when Vladimir died, there was no clear line of succession and political infighting ensued; the resulting anarchy and civil war made trade difficult and invasion inevitable.

Politically, the structure of the Kievan Federation left the people without the tools necessary to ward off invaders and prosecute a winnable war. The aristocracy had no real power to deal with foreign states and there was no seat of true power as was found in feudal Europe. The Kievan Federation lacked the land-grant vassal—lord system which made England and France strong. In those two states, the king granted land to his loyal knights in return for cooperation, loyalty and tax revenue. The knight, or vassal, would then parcel the land out to renters or serfs, in order to bring in wealth. The king offered protection to the knight by control of an army to ward off invaders and the knight afforded safety to the serfs by local protection.

The Kievan federation, however, took the path of the German Empire and still contained characteristics of city-state independence; the individual family communes still thought of themselves as independent entities. In Europe as often happened, independent states often banded together and formed a strong central power in efforts to achieve a common goal, such as defense. Unfortunately for the people of Rus' they found themselves with no strong government, no clear successor, and no foreseeable way to ward off the invasions of its enemies.

Tatar invasions 

1237 marked the beginning of a period of decline for the Rus', as both a culture and as a people. The first through Fourth Crusade, which effectively halted trade with the Byzantine Empire and cut off the Middle Eastern trade routes, began the decline of Kievan importance. The Mongol invasion of 1237 also helped mark the passing of free Kievian society. The Tatars sacked Kiev and all major towns; their practice of total destruction led to the dismemberment of the Kievian princedom and an end to Russian society as their people knew it. With the annihilation of Kiev and every city west of it all the way into Central Europe, Russian trade with the west and south was curtailed. With the destruction of its trade base and its trade routes curtailed, Kiev's role as an important seat of power ended. The people found it necessary to move to the northeast where they found a new home in the princedoms of the upper Volga River and Oka River.

As the invading Mongols ravaged the countryside, entire populations were wiped out. The peasant and serf classes were nearly destroyed en totalium; the continuation of the historical family commune social structure was broken and proved ineffective for large-scale governmental control. Most of the minor princedoms were destroyed. Most cities in the Rus' were razed and the population found it necessary to flee to the northeast in hopes of escaped the wrath of the Golden Horde.

As the Golden Horde expanded across Asia, the Khanate found it necessary to incorporate different governing aspects of the peoples it conquered; from these, much was taken from the Chinese. Their philosophy on autocratic dual government was carried from the Tatar state all the way to Muscovite Rus'. The ruling Khanate injected the Mongol governing ideology into the Rus', formed its princes to this mold and exacted control on the society as dictated by their synthesized theorem of government and established dominance over the Rus' political structure.

The Mongols realized the importance of cultural assimilation and local government. Mongols borrowed the political and cultural ideas from the societies they conquered. The Qipchaq idea of dual government, a principle of dual civil-military administration used to affect control over a large area, was initially developed by the Han Chinese. Han civil code, with the synthesis of Islamic iqtā, a system of decentralized cavalry control (power dispersion), proved to be an effective way of governing the Mongols' empire. After the death of Genghis Khan it was obvious the succeeding khans needed to implement effective government control over their subjects; the importance of local government, run by the natives, became evident.

By the early 14th century, the Prince of Moscow was seen as one of the chief princes of the Rus', and by the late 14th century recognized as the chief prince of Rus', or Grand Prince. Consequently, the Khanate granted him the governing power of the Mongolian basqaqs, or governor. Power was laid to the prince to collect taxes and use military force to maintain order. When the Khan was thoroughly convinced the Grand Prince could perform all the duties of the basqaqs effectively, he was given total control and the Mongol basqaqs were withdrawn from the Rus'. Although the Khan removed his governors due to acquiescence and acceptance of Qipachaq authority, he did maintain an envoy to the Rus' to keep open dialogue with the Grand Prince. In concession to the khan for this near autonomy, a monetary payment based on population, military service and of course compliance to Qipachaq whim was demanded. In effect the Rus' was commanded as a tribute state to the Mongol Empire.

Taking advantage of a peaceful situation with the Mongols, the Grand Prince was able to look again to his princedom and began extending his power further from Moscow. Grand Princes of Moscow ruled the Rus' for much of the rest of the century in near peace. As the Grand Princes extended their power, land ownership was assuming a more dominant role in deciding one's true worth in the social strata. Throughout the 14th and 15th centuries there were no restrictions on land ownership, as men of every class were able to hold a piece of dirt and call the other their equal. Since primary production was still the chief means of working the land, the serf class, as was seen in England, did not develop quickly. Instead the land was worked by the owner and his family, slaves, and those he paid for labor.

Internal consolidation of power accompanied outward expansion of the Rus' state. Even though the occurrences of private land ownership were increasing, the Grand Prince and his subservient princes considered all the lands of their realms their personal property. Traditionally the Grand Prince was forced to recognize private ownership of land, because the prince was not able to wield enough power to push his belief in supreme ownership. Later, when the Grand Prince was able to consolidate power, the idea of princely land ownership would not be forgotten and would have consequences on the future.

End of Mongol domination 
It was under Grand Prince Dmitri Donskoy (1359–1389) that the Grand Prince of Moscow became strong enough to fight the Mongols and win. In 1378, self-assured in his power, he stopped paying tribute. Pro-Byzantine and pro-Mongol factions began to develop among the people. Some saw the Byzantine Church and the Byzantine Emperor as the direction the Rus' should take; one not allowing for Tatar administrative and military dominance. The others saw the Mongols as a supreme way to organize and stay away from non-secular governmental influences.

Helping the Rus' cause, in the time of Dmitri and his successor Vasili I (1389–1425), was the fact that the Golden Horde was crippled, first by a civil war, then by a devastating invasion by Tamerlane. Afterwards, Vasili I never paid full tribute, rather, he just sent the Khan "gifts" when he cared to. The next prince, Vasili II (1425–1462), reversed the roles of lord & vassal by putting a Mongol prince in charge of one of his cities.

By the time of Ivan III of Russia's ascension to power, various semi-independent princes still claimed specific territories, but he forced the lesser princes to acknowledge the Grand Prince of Moscow and his descendants as unquestioned rulers with control over military, judicial, and foreign affairs. Ivan also (strongly) implemented the philosophy of all the land being the Grand Prince's personal property.

Ivan III also reorganized the land of Rus' in such a way as to impose his power and authority over Muscovy. Among his most important accomplishments was the unification under Moscow of the entire Rus'. Much like his predecessors, Ivan used every trick imaginable to gain more land: cash purchase, inheritance, forced treaties, and of course war. He started by buying Yaroslavl in 1463, and Rostov in 1474. He also conquered Tver in 1485, and persuaded many Russian nobles in Grand Duchy of Lithuania to transfer their allegiance to Ivan; this move started the rolling back of the Polish-Lithuanian frontier. Before Ivan III assumed the crown of Moscow, most of the land of Russia was in the hands of a small group of men; twenty-seven men controlled one third of the land not owned by the Church (when he died, Ivan passed to his son Vasili III, a great nation covering 55,000 square miles).

In 1480 Ivan was able to cause a withdrawal of the Mongols horde along the banks of the Ugra River, marking an end to Rus' Tatar domination; while not a true battle, this pseudo-battle was probably the most important fight for early Muscovy.

Perhaps Ivan's greatest triumph, other than backing down the Khan, was the conquest of Novgorod, the last stronghold of Kievian Russian culture. "Lord Novgorod the Great" had always been the largest Russian city-state, with colonies in Finland and even the northern Urals. Ivan's covetous eye upon Novgorod's wealth, combined with large numbers of Muscovites moving to Novgorod's lands in the Urals, brought a war in 1478.

Between 1484 and 1505 Ivan III systematically took all the land of Novgorod's aristocracy. As his personal land holdings increased (read the size of Rus'), it became ever obvious to Ivan that the administration system of the land would have to be altered to suit such holdings. He also began to realize the importance of a true national army. To remedy both situations he began settling his devoted warriors in Novgorod, about twenty-three thousand in all. He vested the warriors with ample estates in return for devoted military service. By doing this, Ivan planted the first true roots of feudalism in Rus'.

He also broke the European tradition of only giving fiefs to aristocratic knights. Perhaps 60 percent of his new estate holders were regular servicemen where only five percent were formerly aristocratic. His pomestie system became the new norm for the administration of land in Rus'. Land parcels were rented to serfs and peasants in return for their labor and service to Ivan III's vassal. Peasants soon had restrictions removed on free movement and began to see their rights increase at a steady rate.

In contrast to Europe where feudalism created a strong central power, it took a strong central power to develop feudalism in Rus'. The main conclusion that can be drawn from the history of Rus' expansion and power consolidation from the time of Kiev until the founding of the czar is that a lack of true central power weakened and doomed the Rus' to outside domination. In Rus' the system of landlord/worker, loosely called feudalism, developed after a strong central power was established. Lacking a feudal system of vassal loyalty made it impossible for any prince, early on, to gain enough influence and power to project a strong force against any invaders.

References 
 Blum, Jerome, Lord and Peasant in Russia. Princeton: Princeton University Press, 1961.
 Evtuhov et al. A History of Russia. Boston: HMC, 2004.
 Ostrowski, Donald G., Muscovy and the Mongols. Cambridge: Cambridge University Press.
 Vernadsky, George, The Origins of Russia. Oxford: Clarendon Press, 1959.

Society of Kievan Rus'
Feudalism in Russia